Socialist Studies was an academic book series published annually by the Society for Socialist Studies (Canada).

Series history

External links
Socialist Studies (official website)

Political mass media in Canada